The southern crested guineafowl (Guttera edouardi) is a member of the Numididae, the guineafowl bird family. It is found in open forest, woodland and forest-savanna mosaics. It was previously known as the crested guineafowl when the three species were lumped together. The eastern crested guineafowl is found from Tanzania to South Africa.

Subspecies
 G. e. barbata (Ghigi, 1905) – Malawi crested guineafowl – southeastern Tanzania to eastern Mozambique and Malawi
 G. e. edouardi (Hartlaub, 1867) - Edward's crested guineafowl – eastern Zambia to Mozambique and eastern South Africa

References

southern crested guineafowl
southern crested guineafowl
southern crested guineafowl